Sa Re Ga Ma Pa Ek Main Aur Ek Tu is a duet singing competition and was the 2nd public voting singing competition in the Sa Re Ga Ma Pa series on Zee TV. It featured some new contestants and some old contestants from Sa Re Ga Ma Pa Challenge 2005 that were paired up in duets. The winners of the show were Ujjaini Mukherjee and Aishwarya Nigam, and the runners up were Sharib and Bonjyotsna. Like all the other shows in the Sa Re Ga Ma Pa series, Ek Main Aur Ek Tu was hosted by Shaan. The judges for the show were Lesle Lewis and Hariharan. The Grand Finale was held at the Airport Expo in Dubai, U.A.E

Contestants 
There were 18 final contestants that were paired up into 9 duets:
 Vineeta Punn & Niladri Debnath
 Raktima Mukherjee & Vishwanath Batunge
 Joyeeta Sen & Saptak Bhattacharjee
 Sinchan Dixit & Mohammed Irfan
 Prajakta Ranade & Hrishikesh Ranade
 Twinkle Bajpai & Vishwas Rai
 Sanchali Chatterjee & Rajeev Chamba
 Banjyotsna Borgohain & Sharib Sabri (runners-up)
 Ujjaini Mukherjee & Aishwarya Nigam (winners)

Cast
 Shaan – Co-host (left towards the end of the show)
 Ishita Arun – Co-host
 Rohit Roy – Co-host (towards the end of the show)
 Hariharan – Judge
 Lesle Lewis – Judge

Sa Re Ga Ma Pa
2006 Indian television series debuts
2006 Indian television series endings